Burhanpur Assembly constituency is one of the 230 Vidhan Sabha (Legislative Assembly) constituencies of Madhya Pradesh state in central India.

It's a part of Burhanpur District.
Current Member of Legislative Assembly is Thakur Surendra Singh, an Independent Politician.

Members of Legislative Assembly

Election Result

2018

2013

See also
 Burhanpur

References

Assembly constituencies of Madhya Pradesh